Planplatten (2,245 m) is a mountain situated above Meiringen in the Bernese Oberland in Switzerland. In 1999 a panoramic restaurant (the Alpentower) has been built on the summit which is accessible by gondola lift.

See also
List of mountains of Switzerland accessible by public transport

References

External links 
 
 Alpentower website
 Planplatten on Hikr

Mountains of Switzerland
Mountains of the Alps
Cable cars in Switzerland
Mountains of the canton of Bern
Two-thousanders of Switzerland